("speak Christian"), or just  , is a creole language spoken by the Kristang, a community of people of mixed Portuguese and Malay ancestry, chiefly in Malacca, Malaysia.

Locals and most of the Kristang community in Malacca refer to the language as "Portugis", while in Singapore it is known as Kristang.

In Atlas of the World's Languages in Danger (2010; formerly the Red Book of Endangered Languages) published by UNESCO, Kristang is classified as a "severely endangered" language, with only about 2,000 speakers. Up to 2014, linguists concerned with Kristang have generally accepted a combined speaker population of about 1,000 individuals or less. The language has about 750 speakers in Malacca and another 100 in Singapore. A small number of speakers also live in other Portuguese Eurasian communities in Kuala Lumpur and Penang in Malaysia, and in diaspora communities in Perth (Western Australia), Canada, the United Kingdom and elsewhere.

Etymology
Its endonym Papia Kristang is taken from Portuguese papear cristão ("to chat/speak Christian"). The papia element of the name is cognate with Papiamento, another Portuguese-based creole spoken in the Dutch West Indies.

History

Origins 

The Kristang language originated after the conquest of Malacca (Malaysia) in 1511 by the Portuguese Empire. Until a takeover by the Dutch in 1642, Malacca served as one of the key ports in the trade and administration network of Portuguese establishments along with Goa and Hormuz, allowing Portugal control over main Asiatic trade routes. The lingua franca of Malacca then was a pidginised form of Malay known as Bazaar Malay or Melayu Pasar, used amongst the resident foreign population which then consisted mainly of Javanese, Tamils and Hokkien Chinese. The constant traffic of Portuguese and traders of other origins such as India eventually gave birth to Papia Kristang, one of many Portuguese-derived contact languages which resulted from Portuguese colonial expansion during the fifteenth and sixteenth centuries. A pidgin Portuguese preceding the Kristang creole has also been proposed, whereby a reduced system based on Portuguese converges with other languages present in the contact situation.

The community of Kristang speakers descends mainly from interracial relationships between Portuguese men and local women, as well as a number of migrants from Portuguese India, themselves of mixed Indo-Portuguese ancestry. This was supported by Portuguese officials who advocated mixed marriages in the face of a labour shortage in the colonies, leading to the very first native speakers of Kristang as well as the development of the creole.

Even after Portugal lost Malacca and almost all contact in 1641, the Kristang community largely preserved its language. The demographics of Malacca in the mid-17th century was still predominantly made up of the Portuguese even under Dutch control. The Irmang di Greza (Brothers of the Church), a manifestation of the bond between language and religion in the Kristang culture, acted as an intermediary between the priest and the remnants of the Portuguese population despite prohibition by the Dutch. Liturgy and pastoral sessions were conducted in Kristang in Malacca, which contributed to the longevity of the language into a period as late as the 20th century.

Kristang also had a substantial influence on Macanese, the creole language spoken in Macau, due to substantial migration from Malacca after its conquest by the Dutch.

Attrition of Kristang 
The ceding of Malacca by the Dutch to the British via the Anglo-Dutch Treaty of 1824 directly caused the decline of the Kristang language. By the mid 19th century, many Kristangs flocked towards clerical and auxiliary positions provided by their new colonial masters. As such, the Kristang language saw a decline in use compared to English. In addition, the rising affluence of the region meant more job opportunities, resulting in many Kristangs moving away from Malacca. Moreover, the language is not taught at school, although there are still some Church services in Kristang.

In the context of Singapore, Kristang arrived in the 1820s due to the large influx of Eurasian immigrants from Malacca. This resulted in a Kristang-speaking community large enough for the variety of the language spoken in Singapore to be acknowledged as a distinct variety of Creole Portuguese. However, there was little exposure and recognition of Kristang in Singapore, especially when English became entrenched as the sole language of education and the major language used in most spheres of society after the country gained independence in 1965. As a result, the intergenerational transmission of Kristang ceased almost completely.

The upkeep of Kristang can largely be attributed to its connection with the dominant religion of the Portuguese and their relative social standing in their communities between the 1600s to the late 1800s. The core Kristang-speaking communities gradually eroded due to better socioeconomic opportunities elsewhere. Post-World War Two, the new generation of Catholic priests that arrived to replace the pre-war priests who had been executed demonstrated little sensitivity towards the Kristang language and culture. Eventually, the bond between Kristang and religion was severed due to the association of the Portuguese Mission with the St Xavier's Church.

Migration overseas and intermarriage with other nationalities have also led to Kristang speakers leaving the Portuguese Settlement in order to live and work in other parts of Malaysia. Furthermore, the dominantly Kristang-speaking middle-class gradually began to speak English for practical reasons, altering the prestige of English with regards to Kristang. To many in the community, they grew to accept that speaking English was a key to employment instead of Kristang, facilitating a breakdown in the transmission of Kristang.

Revitalisation efforts
Papia Kristang is facing a steep decline in language use within the community. There has been an apparent language shift to English and Bahasa Malaysia due to the reduced prestige and accessibility of Kristang. However, revitalization efforts have begun in recent years in both the Portuguese Settlement in Singapore and Malacca. Such efforts have seen some success, nearly tripling the number of Kristang speakers of varying fluency.

Singapore
The revitalisation of Papia Kristang in Singapore can be largely attributed to the Kodrah Kristang ('Awaken, Kristang') initiative led by Kevin Martens Wong. This long-term revitalisation initiative seeks to revitalize the language by teaching it to a new generation of learners through complementary classes and the provision of online materials. Kodrah Kristang initially began with a small group of 14 people, eventually developing into a thorough Kristang revitalisation plan known as the Kaminyu di Kodramintu (Path of Awakening). The goals of the plan are twofold. Firstly, it sought to create a sizable pool of 50-100 new adults speakers who have acquired Kristang as a secondary language, speaking it alongside 75-100 elderly speakers. The subsequent focus will then be placed on intergenerational transmission. These estimates were made based on comparisons with other revitalized languages such as Hawaiian. In 2017, they also held the first Kristang Language Festival which was attended by more than 1,400 people, including the Portuguese-Eurasian community in Singapore and Singapore's Deputy Prime Minister Teo Chee Hean.

A Kristang Online Dictionary was also launched at the Kristang Language Festival. The project, Pinchah Kristang: A Dictionary of Kristang, is led and developed by Luís Morgado da Costa based on the WordNet system developed at Nanyang Technological University. This dictionary also supports another initiative known as Jardinggu, or Kristang Lexical Incubator. Initiated in April 2017, the Jardinggu provides a space for the discussion and accelerated addition of new words into the Kristang lexicon. Through this initiative, around 320 new lexemes for concepts that were previously represented by English loans have been suggested by the Kodrah community.

Malacca
The Kristang-speaking community located at the Portuguese Settlement, or Padri sa Chang (“The Priest’s Land”) was able to undertake more sustained revitalisation efforts and publicise itself to non-Eurasian Malaysians, and the language. Notably with texts, stories and phrasebooks in Kristang produced by Joan Margaret Marbeck and through investments and interest from individuals and organisations outside the community. Joan Marbeck has produced three publications: Ungu Adanza (An Inheritance), Linggu Mai (Mother Tongue) and the Kristang Phrasebook. She is also credited with writing probably the only play in Kristang, called Seng Marianne (Without Marianne) and was also instrumental in staging a musical in Kristang - Kazamintu no Praiya which translates to 'Wedding on the beach'.

Within the community, there were efforts made together with the help of academics to promote their culture and the Kristang language. In 1988, Alan Baxter published A grammar of Kristang based on his fieldwork within the community. This was the first book which focused on the descriptive grammar of Kristang and established many core concept on Kristang linguistics. It also had a significant impact on many later studies on Kristang.

Support was also received from the Lisbon-based Calouste Gulbenkian Foundation, which funded and published Marbeck's Kristang texts, as well as the University of Malaya and linguists like Dr. Stefanie Pillai, who have produced a CD of Kristang hymns, and in plans of developing Kristang textbook for beginners.

Along with Malacca Portuguese-Eurasian Association (MPEA) president Michael Gerald Singho, they published a textbook, Beng Prende Portugues Malaká (Papiá Cristang), also known as Come, Let's Learn Portugues Malaká (Papiá Cristang) for people who want to learn Kristang. The association also maintains an active Facebook page aimed at sharing and promoting information related to the Kristang language the Kristang way of life.

Vocabulary
The Kristang lexicon borrows heavily from Portuguese, but often with drastic truncation. Due to its largely Portuguese vocabulary, the Kristang lexicon has much in common with other Portuguese-based creoles, including the near-extinct creoles of Indonesia and East Timor. As it is primarily a creole, much of its vocabulary is also derived from Chinese, Indian and Malay languages to varying degrees.

Metathesis was common in the derivation of the Kristang lexicon from Portuguese root words.
e.g.
Portuguese gordo → Kristang godru "fat"

Writing system 
Kristang was and is still largely an oral language and has never been taught officially in schools. The language is seldom written except by isolated individuals, including linguists and Portuguese missionaries. Most of the existing texts were of a religious nature and written in some modification of Portuguese orthography.

In general, attempts to spell Kristang falls into three broad categories:

1. A system based on Portuguese orthography
The 19th and 20th centuries saw a rise in the use of Modern Portuguese-based orthography (for example, Rego (1942)) due to the perception of Kristang as a variety of Portuguese instead of a distinct creole language partially based on Old Portuguese. This is characterized by the use of diacritics such as acute accents (á, é, í, ó, ú). The system has been adopted by some native Kristang speakers as well.

2. A system based on a mixture of Portuguese, English and Malay
Other speakers have used a system influenced by Portuguese, English and Malay orthography. This creates an issue as the system is inconsistent in the representation of Kristang sounds and are unintelligible immediately to both speakers and non-speakers of Kristang.

3. A system based on Malay orthography
There are many observable parallels between the phonology of Malay and Kristang which has led to inherent similarities in the orthographic representations of the two languages as well. The first proposal for a standard Kristang orthography was made in 1973 by Ian F. Hancock (1973:25) who recognised this quality and advocated the Malay-based system due to the speakers' familiarity with it. This would, therefore, lead to a swift acquisition of literacy in the reading and writing of the Kristang language. 
This system to spell Kristang was further expanded on in A Grammar of Kristang by Alan N. Baxter, in which he agreed on and emphasized the use of the Malay orthography. Published in 1995, Joan Margaret Marbeck's book Ungua Andanza also followed this approach, with the orthography written in a Luso-Malay context.

The choice of orthography is significant as the maintenance of the Kristang language will depend on increasing the numbers of active Kristang speakers. Currently, the choice of an orthography presents a hindrance to the revitalization efforts of Kristang due to inconsistency and unintelligibility. While there exist relatively valuable historical works on the Kristang culture, the community would have difficulty reading it because of its spelling. As written Malay can be understood by many literate people not only in Malaysia but also other Malay-speaking countries, many later studies advocate a Malay-derived orthography which may also prove to be beneficial in increasing the prospects of the language's survival.

Phonology 
The acoustic and articulatory properties of Kristang have not been extensively studied. However, Hancock (1969, 1973), Batalha (1981), and most recently, Baxter (1988) have outlined brief descriptions of its sound system. In general, Kristang's inventory of consonant and vowel phonemes shows a significant parallel to that of Standard Malay.

Consonants

Orthographic note:
Using a Malay-based orthography, the sounds are represented orthographically by their symbols as above, except:
  is written as 
  is written as 
  is written as 

Portuguese chegar  → Kristang chegak  "two"
Portuguese chuva  → Kristang chua  "rain"
This may be due to Malay influence, or the preservation of an Old Portuguese pronunciation  in Kristang. It is also worth noting that Northern Portugal also retains the Portuguese  pronunciation.

Phonological contrasts

Baxter (1988), in particular, established various phonemic contrasts in the Kristang consonant system.

Stops and affricates contrast in the initial and medial positions.

Fricatives contrast in the medial positions.

Nasals contrast do not contrast before a consonant, and no contrasts have been found in identical environments in the final position. In the initial position, only ,  and  contrast, while all nasals  contrast in the medial position. Tap, as well as lateral liquid consonants, contrast in all positions.

Vowels

The inventory of vowel phonemes in Kristang is also highly similar to Standard Malay vowel phonemes, which can be seen in the table above.

Diphthongs and vowel sequences
Diphthongs in Kristang are formed when either the vowel , or the vowel , occurs in the same syllable as another vowel.

There are 10 word-internal diphthongs in Kristang as outlined by Baxter (1988).

The relatively large number of diphthongs is also in contrast to Malay, whereby only three native diphthong phonemes are described:
 : kedai ('shop')
 : kerbau ('buffalo')
 : dodoi ('lullaby')

Portuguese dois/dous → Kristang dos 'two'
Portuguese à noite/à noute → Kristang anoti/anuti 'tonight'
 
Kristang diphthongs are monosyllabic and the vowel sequences are differentiated according to its stress position.

Stress and rhythm
Kristang is a syllable-timed language (not unlike Malay which also displays syllable-based rhythm).

According to Baxter (2004), most polysyllabic words in Kristang can be classified into two large groups based on the stress position in the word.
Stress Rule A
Most words which end in a vowel have tonic stress on the penultimate syllable.

Stress Rule B
Most words which end in a consonant have tonic stress on the final syllable.

However, stress pattern is not completely predictable in Kristang, as there are also certain words which are exceptions to the above two rules. 
Exception to Rule A
Verbs which end in a stressed vowel (e.g. kumi 'to eat'). Attention should be paid to the lexical stress in such instances as it brings about a difference in meaning (e.g. kaza 'house' vs kaza 'to marry").
Some vowel-ending words are also stressed on the antepenultimate syllable instead. (such as familia 'family', animu 'valour')
Exception to Rule B
Some consonant-ending words are stressed on the penultimate syllable (such as okel 'spectacles', nobas 'news')

Kristang also displays stress shifting in that many verbs display a tendency to shift their stress from the final syllable to penultimate syllable when followed by a stressed syllable in the next word, especially in rapid speech.

Grammar 
The grammatical structure of Kristang is similar to that of the Malay language. The usage of verbs is one of the grammatical features of Kristang that displays this quality. While Portuguese verbs mainly use morphology, or suffixes, to change a verb's tense or for it to match with the person and number of its subject, Malay does not change the form of the verb itself. Instead, it makes use of pre-verbal words to convey tense and does not indicate the person or number of the subject in the form of the verb. Kristang's structure is practically identical to Malay, although the choice of words comes from Portuguese.

Syntax

Papiá Kristang has Subject-Verb-Object (SVO) word order in simple sentences. The direct human objects are case-marked by the preposition ku. The same preposition also marks indirect objects. Intransitive clauses, the case-marked indirect object may precede the direct object, especially when the former is pronominal. Noncore arguments are generally located either at the beginning or at the end of the sentence as shown in example (1).

Adversity Passive, which is used to talk about situations where a negative action happens to something, but the person or originator of the negative action is not mentioned something, is also present both in Kristang and Malay. The Adversity Passive is signalled by kena (Malay), and by tokah (Kristang).

For complex sentences, the phrases and clauses are joined by coordinating conjunctions ku "with, and", kě "or", and mas "but". There are also instances where object clauses may be headed by ki; however, this is rare and is only found in traditional formal registers, as in a wedding speech. The most frequent means of expressing nominal subordination is parataxis as shown in example (2) and (3).

Adverbial clauses are headed by antis di "before", kiora "when", chuma "as", kantu "if", padi "in order to", kauzu ki "because", kifoi "because", etc., yet may also be indicated by parataxis without conjunctions.

Relative clauses are headed by ki "what, who’"(and very rarely by keng "who"), yet also commonly occur with a pronoun head or may occur without it. This can be seen in example (4) and (5).

In Kristang, The noun phrase (NP) is a structure which can occur as subject of a verb,
object of a verb, object of a relator or as a predicate.

There are five types of prenominal determiners in Kristang:

Quantifier:

Numeral:

Interrogative determiner:

Demonstrative article:

The demonstratives isi and ake(li) ‘that’ precede the noun and indicate a distance contrast.

Possessive NP + sa :

Adnominal possessives precede the noun and consist of possessor (noun or pronoun) + genitive marker sa (or sě).

In comparative constructions of equality, the adjective is marked by iguál ‘equal’ and standard is marked by ku ‘with’:

In the comparative construction of inequality, the adjective is marked by más ‘more’ and the standard by di ‘of’:

The superlative comparison consists of the comparative of inequality plus a universal standard:

There is only one set of personal pronouns that occurs in all pronominal functions. The 3SG and 3PL pronouns only refer to animates, principally to humans.

Morphology
Pluralisation is also the same in Malay as in Kristang. For example, in English and Portuguese, an ‘–s’ is added to make cats or gatos, whereas in Kristang and Malay, the entire word is duplicated, such as gatu-gatu in Kristang, and kucing-kucing in Malay. Reduplication is not only a
feature of the noun class but also a feature of the adjective, adverb and verb classes. Adjectives and adverbs reduplicate to signify intensity: kěni~kěninu, “quite small, very small”, belu belu “quite old”, sedu sedu “quite/very early”. On the other hand, the interrogative pronouns reduplicate to signify indefiniteness: keng keng (who who) “whoever”, ki ki (what what “whatever”. As for the reduplication of the numerals, dos “two” and tres “three”, it gave the respective readings “in pairs” and “in threes”.

With nouns, reduplication can signal plurality, often involving partial reduplication: krenkrensa (= krensa + krensa) ‘children’, femfemi (= femi + femi) ‘women’. However, the reduplication of nouns with non-specific reference in object position may yield the meaning ‘all kinds of’ or ‘lots of’:

Without reduplication, the above sentence would simply express plural: ‘birds’.

To indicate verb tenses, the following appositions are used: jah (i.e. from the Portuguese já, meaning "already", or controversially a corruption of Malay dah, shortened version of sudah, also "already") for past tenses; ta (from está, which means "is") for present continuous tenses and logu or lo (from logo, which means "soon") for the future tense. These simplified forms correspond with their equivalents in Malay sudah, sedang, and akan, respectively.

Papiá Kristang has two overt markers of aspect (ja ‘perfective’ and ta ‘imperfective’), an overt marker of future tense (lo(gu)), and a zero marker.

This table summarised the functions of these markers:

Example (15) shows the zero marker (Ø) with a dynamic verb of past or present habitual representation:

Example (16) shows the marker ja with a dynamic verb, with perfective aspect representation:

The marker ta occurs with dynamic verbs in past or present contexts, with either a progressive reading, as in (17), or an iterative reading, as in (18):

The marker lo(go) conveys a future or conditional reading, as in examples (19) and (20), respectively where it occurs with a dynamic verb:

The Tense-Aspect-Mood (TAM) markers do not normally co-occur. Combinations of markers are very rare and when they do occur they appear to involve an adverbial reading of the initial marker. Thus, when ja is seen to combine with the imperfective marker ta, ja has the adverbial reading ‘already’ of its Portuguese source:

Kristang examples

Numbers
Much of the lexicon for Kristang numbers draws influence from Portuguese, a Romance language. However, unlike Portuguese, which distinguishes between the masculine and feminine forms of “one” (um/uma) and “two” (dois/duas), numbers in Kristang do not inflect for gender.

Pronouns
A peculiarity of the language is the pronoun yo (meaning "I") which is used in Northern Portuguese (pronounced as yeu), as well as Spanish and Italian/Sicilian.

Common phrases

Poem of Malacca
Keng teng fortuna fikah na Malaka,
Nang kereh partih bai otru tera.
Pra ki tudu jenti teng amizadi,
Kontu partih logu fikah saudadi.

Oh Malaka, tera di San Francisku,
Nteh otru tera ki yo kereh.
Oh Malaka undi teng sempri fresku,
Yo kereh fikah ateh mureh.

Portuguese translation:
Quem tem fortuna fica em Malaca,
Não quer partir para outra terra.
Por aqui toda a gente tem amizade,
Quando tu partes logo fica a saudade.

Ó Malaca, terra de São Francisco,
Não tem outra terra que eu queira.
Ó Malaca, onde tem sempre frescura,
Eu quero ficar até morrer.

English translation:
Who is lucky stays in Malacca,
Doesn't want to go to another land.
In here everyone has friendship,
When one leaves soon has saudade.

Oh Malacca, land of Saint Francis,
There is no other land that I want.
Oh Malacca, where there's always freshness,
I want to stay here until I die.

Malay translation:

Siapa beruntung tinggal di Melaka,
Tidak mahu ke tanah berbeza.
Di sini semua bersahabat,
Bila seorang pergi terasa rindu.

Oh Melaka, tanah Saint Francis,
Tiada tanah lain yang ku mahu.
Oh Melaka, dimana adanya kesegaran,
Aku mahu tinggal di sini hingga ke akhir nyawa.

See also 
Kristang people
Eurasians in Singapore
Chavacano language, a Spanish-derived Malayo-Polynesian creole
Batavia, Dutch East Indies, as Kristang is also called Malacca–Batavia Creole

Further reading

References 
  Text in this article was copied from Alan N. Baxter. 2013. "Papiá Kristang". In: Michaelis, Susanne Maria & Maurer, Philippe & Haspelmath, Martin & Huber, Magnus (eds.) The survey of pidgin and creole languages. Volume 2: Portuguese-based, Spanish-based, and French-based Languages. Oxford: Oxford University Press, which is available under a Creative Commons Attribution 3.0 (CC BY 3.0) license.

External links 
Kodrah Kristang: Kristang in Singapore Revitalization Project and Classes
Papia, Relijang e Tradisang, The Portuguese Eurasians in Malaysia
Malacca Portuguese Eurasian Association
Malacca Portuguese Settlement
 Singapore Eurasian Association Kristang Page
Joan Marbeck's homepage
Jingkli Nona - a Kristang viewpoint
The Theseira family
The Shepherdson family
The Peranakan Association Singapore
The Eurasian Company of the Singapore Volunteer Corps
Pasar Malam Besar festival in the Netherlands
Malaysian Eurasian food
All Portuguese Language Meetup Groups
Portuguese people speaking society
Endangered Languages

Languages of Malaysia
Languages of Singapore
Portuguese-based pidgins and creoles
Endangered pidgins and creoles
Portuguese language in Asia
Severely endangered languages